Behaviouralism (or behavioralism) is an approach in political science that emerged in the 1930s in the United States. It represented a sharp break from previous approaches in emphasizing an objective, quantified approach to explain and predict political behaviour. It is associated with the rise of the behavioural sciences, modeled after the natural sciences. Behaviouralism claims it can explain political behaviour from an unbiased, neutral point of view.

Behaviouralists seek to examine the behaviour, actions, and acts of individuals – rather than the characteristics of institutions such as legislatures, executives, and judiciaries – and groups in different social settings and explain this behavior as it relates to the political system.

Origins
From 1942 through the 1970s, behaviouralism gained support. It was probably Dwight Waldo who coined the term for the first time in a book called "Political Science in the United States" which was released in 1956. It was David Easton however who popularized the term. It was the site of discussion between traditionalist and new emerging approaches to political science. The origins of behaviouralism is often attributed to the work of University of Chicago professor Charles Merriam, who in the 1920s and 1930s emphasized the importance of examining political behaviour of individuals and groups rather than only considering how they abide by legal or formal rules.

As a political approach
Prior to the "behaviouralist revolution", political science being a science at all was disputed. Critics saw the study of politics as being primarily qualitative and normative, and claimed that it lacked a scientific method necessary to be deemed a science.
Behaviouralists used strict methodology and empirical research to validate their study as a social science. The behaviouralist approach was innovative because it changed the attitude of the purpose of inquiry. It moved toward research that was supported by verifiable facts. In the period of 1954-63, Gabriel Almond spread behaviouralism to comparative politics by creation of a committee in SSRC. During its rise in popularity in the 1960s and '70s, behaviouralism challenged the realist and liberal approaches, which the behaviouralists called "traditionalism", and other studies of political behaviour that was not based on fact.

To understand political behaviour, behaviouralism uses the following methods: sampling, interviewing, scoring and scaling, and statistical analysis.

Behaviouralism studies how individuals behave in group positions realistically rather than how they should behave. For example, a study of the United States Congress might include a consideration of how members of Congress behave in their positions. The subject of interest is how Congress becomes an 'arena of actions' and the surrounding formal and informal spheres of power.

Meaning of the term
David Easton was the first to differentiate behaviouralism from behaviourism in the 1950s (behaviourism is the term mostly associated with psychology). In the early 1940s, behaviourism itself was referred to as a behavioural science and later referred to as behaviourism. However, Easton sought to differentiate between the two disciplines:

Behavioralism was not a clearly defined movement for those who were thought to be behavioralists. It was more clearly definable by those who were opposed to it, because they were describing it in terms of the things within the newer trends that they found objectionable. So some would define behavioralism as an attempt to apply the methods of natural sciences to human behavior. Others would define it as an excessive emphasis upon quantification. Others as individualistic reductionism. From the inside, the practitioners were of different minds as what it was that constituted behavioralism. [...] And few of us were in agreement.

With this in mind, behaviouralism resisted a single definition. Dwight Waldo emphasized that behaviouralism itself is unclear, calling it "complicated" and "obscure." Easton agreed, stating, "every man puts his own emphasis and thereby becomes his own behaviouralist" and attempts to completely define behaviouralism are fruitless. From the beginning, behaviouralism was a political, not a scientific concept. Moreover, since behaviouralism is not a research tradition, but a political movement, definitions of behaviouralism follow what behaviouralists wanted. Therefore, most introductions to the subject emphasize value-free research. This is evidenced by Easton's eight "intellectual foundation stones" of behaviouralism:
 Regularities - The generalization and explanation of regularities.
 Commitment to Verification - The ability to verify ones generalizations.
 Techniques - An experimental attitude toward techniques.
 Quantification - Express results as numbers where possible or meaningful.
 Values - Keeping ethical assessment and empirical explanations distinct.
 Systemization - Considering the importance of theory in research.
 Pure Science - Deferring to pure science rather than applied science.
 Integration - Integrating social sciences and value.

Subsequently, much of the behavioralist approach has been challenged by the emergence of postpositivism in political (particularly international relations) theory.

Objectivity and value-neutrality
According to David Easton, behaviouralism sought to be "analytic, not substantive, general rather than particular, and explanatory rather than ethical." In this, the theory seeks to evaluate political behaviour without "introducing any ethical evaluations." Rodger Beehler cites this as "their insistence on distinguishing between facts and values."

Criticism
The approach has come under fire from both conservatives and radicals for the purported value-neutrality. Conservatives see the distinction between values and facts as a way of undermining the possibility of political philosophy. Neal Riemer believes behaviouralism dismisses "the task of ethical recommendation" because behaviouralists believe "truth or falsity of values (democracy, equality, and freedom, etc.) cannot be established scientifically and are beyond the scope of legitimate inquiry."

Christian Bay believed behaviouralism was a pseudopolitical science and that it did not represent "genuine" political research. Bay objected to empirical consideration taking precedence over normative and moral examination of politics.

Behaviouralism initially represented a movement away from "naive empiricism", but as an approach has been criticized for "naive scientism". Additionally, radical critics believe that the separation of fact from value makes the empirical study of politics impossible.

Crick's critique
British scholar Bernard Crick in The American Science of Politics (1959), attacked the behavioural approach to politics, which was dominant in the United States, but little known in Britain. He identified and rejected six basic premises and in each case argued the traditional approach was superior to behaviouralism:
research can discover uniformities in human behaviour,
these uniformities could be confirmed by empirical tests and measurements,
quantitative data was of the highest quality, and should be analyzed statistically,
political science should be empirical and predictive, downplaying the philosophical and historical dimensions,
value-free research was the ideal, and
social scientists should search for a macro theory covering all the social sciences, as opposed to applied issues of practical reform.

See also
 Behavioural economics
 Behaviourism
 Postpositivism
 Post-behaviouralism

Notes

References

External links
 Brooks, David (2008-10-27). "The Behavioral Revolution". The New York Times.

Comparative politics
Subfields of political science
Political theories